Valley Township is a township in Armstrong County, Pennsylvania, United States.  The population was 654 at the 2020 census, a decrease from the figure of 656 tabulated in 2010.

Geography
Valley Township is located in central Armstrong County. Cowanshannock Creek, a tributary of the Allegheny River, flows through the southern part of the township. The largest settlement is the unincorporated community of West Valley.

Demographics

As of the census of 2000, there were 681 people, 262 households, and 210 families residing in the township.  The population density was 46.2 people per square mile (17.9/km2).  There were 298 housing units at an average density of 20.2/sq mi (7.8/km2).  The racial makeup of the township was 98.97% White, 0.15% African American, 0.15% Native American, 0.44% Asian, and 0.29% from two or more races.

There were 262 households, out of which 33.2% had children under the age of 18 living with them, 67.9% were married couples living together, 8.0% had a female householder with no husband present, and 19.8% were non-families. 17.2% of all households were made up of individuals, and 8.4% had someone living alone who was 65 years of age or older.  The average household size was 2.60 and the average family size was 2.91.

The township median age of 39 years was slightly less than the county median age of 40 years. The distribution by age group was 23.5% under the age of 18, 8.1% from 18 to 24, 27.8% from 25 to 44, 26.9% from 45 to 64, and 13.8% who were 65 years of age or older.  The median age was 39 years. For every 100 females there were 102.1 males.  For every 100 females age 18 and over, there were 98.9 males.

The median income for a household in the township was $40,000, and the median income for a family was $46,071. Males had a median income of $29,444 versus $20,250 for females. The per capita income for the township was $16,664.  About 6.9% of families and 7.2% of the population were below the poverty line, including 7.1% of those under age 18 and 5.2% of those age 65 or over.

History
Valley Township was formed in 1855, following the petition of residents requesting that Pine Township be split in two pieces.  It was originally proposed that it be named Buffington Township after a local judge, but he demurred, and suggested naming it for any living person be avoided.  Instead, it was named for the valley of the Cowanshannock Creek.

Cemeteries
Mount Union Davis Cemetery
Pine Creek Methodist Cemetery

References

Populated places established in 1807
Townships in Armstrong County, Pennsylvania